Massachusetts law required a majority vote, necessitating additional votes if no one won a majority. This was necessary in 4 of the districts.

In the fourth district, 

In the fifth district, 

In the eighth district,

See also 
 United States House of Representatives elections, 1788 and 1789
 List of United States representatives from Massachusetts

References 

United States House of Representatives elections in Massachusetts
Massachusetts
Massachusetts
United States House of Representatives
United States House of Representatives